Kaniha is a village in Kamrup district surrounded by Kamalpur town. It is 31 km from Guwahati.

Transport
Kaniha is accessible through National Highway 31. All major private commercial vehicles ply between Kaniha and nearby towns.

See also
 Pubborka
 Dimu Dobak

References

Villages in Kamrup district